Fifteen ships of the Royal Navy have borne the name Hound:

 was a 36-gun ship captured in 1652, a hulk in 1656 and broken up in 1660.
 was an 18-gun ship captured in 1656 and expended as a fire ship in 1666.
 was a 4-gun sloop built in 1673 and sold in 1686.
 was an 8-gun fire ship launched in 1690 and expended in 1692.
 was a 4-gun sloop launched in 1700 and broken up in 1714.
 was a 14-gun sloop launched in 1732 and broken up in 1745.
 was a 14-gun sloop launched in 1745 and sold in 1773.
 was a 14-gun sloop launched in 1776.  She was in French hands between 1780 and 1782, when she was renamed Levrette.  She was recaptured and broken up in 1784.
 was a 16-gun sloop launched in 1790. In 1794 the French frigates  and Galatee captured her in the Atlantic. She became the French Navy corvette Levrette (or Levrette No.2), and was last listed in 1796.
 was a 16-gun brig-sloop launched in 1796 and wrecked in 1800 off Shetland, together with all her crew of 120 men and 45 Dutch prisoners of war.
 was a 16-gun sloop previously named Monarch.  She was purchased in 1801, converted to a bomb vessel in 1808 and broken up in 1812.
HMS Hound was to have been an 8-gun brig, ordered in 1839 from Chatham Dockyard.  The order was cancelled in 1844 and transferred to Deptford Dockyard where she was completed as the next HMS Hound.
 was an 8-gun brig launched in 1846, used as a breakwater from 1872 and sold in 1887.
 was an  launched in 1942 and broken up in 1962.

References

Grocott, Terence (1997) Shipwrecks of the revolutionary & Napoleonic eras (Chatham). 

Royal Navy ship names